Miyoshi Plant
 Miyoshi (Mazda factory), in Miyoshi, Hiroshima, Japan
 Miyoshi (Toyota factory), in Miyoshi, Aichi, Pajan